Bell Rock is a butte just north of the Village of Oak Creek, Arizona, south of Sedona in Yavapai County. Its panoramic views make it a popular landmark and tourist attraction.

The most popular route is a moderate hike that reaches a small plateau on the northwest face of the butte. A challenging unmarked trail must be taken to reach the summit.

Geology 

Bell Rock is a butte composed of horizontally bedded sedimentary rock of the Permian Supai Formation.

See also

 Schnebly Hill Formation

References

External links
 Bell Rock Pathway / Vista, USFS

Protected areas of Yavapai County, Arizona
Landforms of Yavapai County, Arizona
Buttes of Arizona
Rock formations of Arizona